KSMI-LD, virtual and UHF digital channel 30, is a low-powered Heartland-affiliated television station licensed to Wichita, Kansas, United States. Owned by Get After It Media, it is operated by Great Plains Television Network, LLC under a local marketing agreement (LMA), making it sister to Class A Independent and Cozi TV-affiliated station KAGW-CD (channel 26). The two stations share offices on South Greenwood Street in Wichita; KSMI-LD's transmitter is located in rural northwestern Sedgwick County (north-northeast of Colwich).

History

The station first signed on the air on June 1, 1990. In the early 2000s, KSMI-LP became an affiliate of the Spanish-language network Telemundo (now on KSNW-DT2); a few years later, it affiliated with Azteca América. Luken Communications purchased the station in 2010, and entered into a local marketing agreement with Great Plains Television Network, LLC to manage the station; that year, the station flash cut its digital signal into operation on UHF channel 51. Luken also began providing the station with affiliations from the company's various networks.

On October 17, 2013, KSMI-LP began transmitting its digital signal (which moved to UHF channel 30) from a new, taller tower near Colwich and increased its effective radiated power to 15 kilowatts. Even though this change resulted an increase in its overall coverage area, the signal is only adequately receivable in the immediate Wichita area with marginal reception south of the city due to adjacent channel interference (a phenomenon in which part of the signal "spills into" an adjacent frequency, making it harder for digital tuner to detect which channel to use) with Univision affiliate KDCU-DT on channel 31 and in areas north of Wichita—particularly Hutchinson—due to both adjacent channel and co-channel interference. KGBD in Great Bend, a semi-satellite of ABC affiliate KAKE (channel 10), also broadcasts on UHF channel 30, making it difficult, if not impossible, to receive KSMI-LP, as the receiver cannot tell decipher between the two stations. The co-channel interference problem is amplified at night due to DXing from signals bouncing off the ionosphere, which permits the signal to travel farther than normal.

Digital television

Digital channels
The station's digital signal is multiplexed:

References

External links
KAGW 26 official website
Broadcast TV: A lot to see for free

SMI-LP
Heartland (TV network) affiliates
Retro TV affiliates
Rev'n affiliates
Television channels and stations established in 1990
1990 establishments in Kansas
Low-power television stations in the United States